Shonagh Maureen Koea (born 1939) is a New Zealand fiction writer.

Biography
Koea was born in Taranaki, New Zealand, in 1939, and grew up in Hastings, Hawke's Bay. She became a journalist and began working at the Taranaki Herald newspaper in New Plymouth. There she met and married a fellow journalist, George Koea of Te Āti Awa. She wrote novels as a pastime; however none were published. In her late 20s Koea stopped writing fiction, disillusioned with her lack of success. However, ten years later, in 1981, she submitted a story to New Zealand's leading literary contest of the time (the Air New Zealand Short Story Competition) and won. Her stories began to be published in magazines such as The Listener.

Koea's husband died in 1987, and in 1990 she moved to Auckland. Since then, she has been a full-time writer; she has received a number of literary grants and fellowships, and produced novels, short stories and memoirs.

Works
Recurring themes in Koea's writing are personal relationships and their difficulties, and men's and women's roles in the family. Male characters are often oppressive, and females initially helpless; after a period, however, the women eventually take charge of their own destiny. Her narratives have been likened to those of fellow New Zealand writers Katherine Mansfield and Frank Sargeson, which also centred on familiar characters and situations.

Koea's main publisher is Random House.

Collections of short stories 

 1987 - The Woman Who Never Went Home and Other Stories 
 1993 - Fifteen Rubies by Candlelight 
 2013 - The Best of Shonagh Koea's Short Stories

Novels 

 1989 - The Grandiflora Tree
 1992 - Staying Home and Being Rotten
 1994 (and reissued in 2007) - Sing To Me, Dreamer
 1996 - The Wedding at Bueno-Vista
 1998 - The Lonely Margins of the Sea 
 2001 - Time for Killing 
 2003 - Yet Another Ghastly Christmas 
 2007 - The Kindness of Strangers: Kitchen Memoirs
 2013 - Rain
 2014 - Landscape with Solitary Figure

Awards and recognition 

 Winner, Air New Zealand Short Story Competition, 1981
 Queen Elizabeth II Literature Committee Writing Bursary, 1989 and 1992
 University of Auckland Fellowship in Literature, 1993
 Buddle Finlay Sargeson Fellowship, 1997
 The Lonely Margins of the Sea was runner up for the Deutz Medal for Fiction in the 1999 Montana New Zealand Book Awards 
 Sing to Me, Dreamer was a finalist in the 1995 New Zealand Post Book Awards

References

External links
  Interview with Shonagh Koea by the Cultural Icons project
  Shonagh Koea in the 2001 TV documentary The Big Art Trip

Living people
1939 births
20th-century New Zealand writers
21st-century New Zealand writers
People from Taranaki
20th-century New Zealand women writers
21st-century New Zealand women writers